Thomson Financial was an arm of the Thomson Corporation, an information provider. When the Thomson Corporation merged with Reuters to form Thomson Reuters in April 2008, Thomson Financial was merged with the business of Reuters to form the Markets Division of Thomson Reuters.

History 
Thomson Financial expanded significantly when it acquired Primark, another financial information provider, on June 6, 2000, for $842 million in an all-cash deal. Primark owned many brands in both the U.S. and UK/Europe such as Datastream, Baseline Financial, Intellivate Capital Ventures (ICV), and IBES.  The acquisition consolidated and combined competing financial information provision, for example the FirstCall and IBES earnings estimate data, under the same company.

Thomson Financial sold its Thomson Media division in 2004.

On 17 April 2008 the Thomson Corporation merged with Reuters and created the new company Thomson Reuters. Thomson Financial and Reuters combined their businesses into the Markets Division: Sales & Trading, Enterprise, Investment & Advisory, and Media.  The other Thomson operations were combined into the Professional Division: Legal, Healthcare & Science, and Tax & Accounting. Thomson Reuters Financial & Risk eventually became Refinitiv.

Major office locations
Thomson Financial had many offices across the US, Europe, and Asia Pacific regions. The head office was based in Boston (1987-2008) and New York (joint with Boston), with significant presence in San Francisco, London, Frankfurt, Bangalore, Manila, and many satellite offices in locations such as Sydney, Hong Kong, Tokyo, Zurich, Geneva, just as some examples. The two major data centers, not including smaller points of presence, for Thomson Financial were located in NYC and New Jersey.

In June 2007, Thomson Financial agreed to buy seven Asia-Pacific news bureaus from Xinhua Finance. The bureaus purchased were in Tokyo, Manila, Jakarta, Kuala Lumpur, Singapore, Sydney and Seoul. Xinhua Finance stated they would retain their operations in Beijing, Shanghai, Hong Kong and Taipei. Financial terms were not disclosed.

Products
The company had a wide variety of financial products. Thomson ONE is a core product, although legacy branded offerings such as Datastream Advance and Global Topic will probably remain for a few years. Thomson ONE  was a competitor of Bloomberg L.P., Capital IQ and FactSet Research Systems.  There were different packages of Thomson ONE, i.e., Thomson ONE for Investment Management, Thomson ONE for Investment Banking, etc. Due to the acquisition of Primark and buyout of ILX Systems, Thomson Financial had seen growth over the previous four years and had seen improvement in the core product Thomson ONE.

Thomson Financial transaction platforms are ubiquitous in financial markets world-wide and included Thomson AutEx trade order indications and executions, Thomson PORTIA automated portfolio management system, Thomson TradeWeb on-line trading network for fixed-income securities, and Thomson BETA Systems for securities data and brokerage processing systems.

See also 
 Thomson Financial League Tables
 Institutional Brokers' Estimate System

References

External links 
 Thomson Financial Services and Products
   Retroactive stock ratings by analysts???
Former assets of Thomson Reuters
Financial services companies disestablished in 2008
Financial services companies of Canada
Book publishing companies of Canada